The 1975–76 WCHL season was the tenth season for the Western Canada Hockey League. Twelve teams completed a 72-game season.  The New Westminster Bruins won their second consecutive President's Cup.

League notes
The WCHL season expanded to 72 games from 70.

Regular season

Final standings

Scoring leaders
Note: GP = Games played; G = Goals; A = Assists; Pts = Points; PIM = Penalties in minutes

1976 WCHL Playoffs

Preliminary round
Medicine Hat defeated Edmonton 4 games to 1
Victoria defeated Regina 4 games to 1 with 1 tied

League quarter-finals
New Westminster defeated Brandon 5 games to 0
Saskatoon defeated Lethbridge 3 games to 1 with 2 tied
Kamloops defeated Winnipeg 3 games to 1 with 2 tied
Victoria defeated Medicine Hat 3 games to 1 with 1 tied

League semi-finals
Saskatoon defeated Kamloops 4 games to 2
New Westminster defeated Victoria 4 games to 0 with 1 tied

WHL Championship
New Westminster defeated Saskatoon 4 games to 2 with 1 tied

All-Star game

On January 15, the West All-Stars defeated the East All-Stars 8–7 at Lethbridge, Alberta with a crowd of 2,413.

WHL awards

All-Star Teams

See also
1976 Memorial Cup
1976 NHL Entry Draft
1975 in sports
1976 in sports

References
whl.ca
 2005–06 WHL Guide

Western Hockey League seasons
WHL